Gopad River is a tributary of Son River. It emerges from the Sonhat Plateau and finally flows into Son river at Bardi (sangrauli district).

References 

Tributaries of the Son River
Rivers of Madhya Pradesh
Rivers of Chhattisgarh
Rivers of India